Bethlehem Center, also known as Babcock's Corners or Bethlehem Centre, is a hamlet in the Town of Bethlehem in Albany County, New York. It is located at the junction of U.S. Route 9W (US 9W) and New York State Route 910A (NY 910A) also known as Feura Bush Road / Glenmont Road.

References

Geography of Albany County, New York
Hamlets in Albany County, New York